Polar ice packs may refer to:
 Sea ice
 Arctic ice pack
 Antarctic sea ice